Khristina Kalcheva (born 29 May 1977) is a retired Bulgarian athlete specialising in the high jump. She is the World Indoor Champion from 1999. She competed at the 2000 Summer Olympics failing to get a valid jump.

She was born in Aleksin in Russia's Tula Oblast.

She has a personal best of 1.99 metres both outdoors and indoors.

Competition record

References

1977 births
Living people
People from Aleksinsky District
Bulgarian female high jumpers
Russian female high jumpers
Athletes (track and field) at the 2000 Summer Olympics
Olympic athletes of Bulgaria
World Athletics Indoor Championships winners
Sportspeople from Tula Oblast
20th-century Bulgarian women